Panthéon (French, 'Pantheon') is the second album by French rapper Booba, released on 16 June 2004 over Tallac Records, via the major Barclay Records/Universal Music Group.

Track listing

Samples
"Tallac" contains a sample of "Max" by Bernard Herrmann.
"Le Mal par le Mal" contains a sample of "Tout c'qu'on connait" by Booba & Nessbeal
"Mon son" contains a sample of "Hold the Line" by Toto.

Singles
2004 : N°10  
2004 : Baby (feat. Nessbeal)  
2004 : Avant De Partir (feat. Léya Masry)

Charts

Weekly charts

Year-end charts

Certifications

In popular culture
The song "N°10" is the entrance song for French UFC fighter Cheick Kongo.

References

External links
 
 Blog
 Panthéon on Myspace
 Booba on Dailymotion

Booba albums
2004 albums
French-language albums
Albums produced by Skread